Tangled Up is the second studio album by American country music singer Thomas Rhett. It was released on September 25, 2015, via Valory Music Group.  The album's lead single "Crash and Burn", was released to radio on April 27, 2015. The album's second single, "Die a Happy Man" was released to country radio on September 28, 2015, but was available for download as a pre-order for the album on September 18, 2015.

Reception

Critical
Stephen Thomas Erlewine of Allmusic thought that the Thomas Rhett's second album feels like an album "where the singer/songwriter comes into his own" and rated the album 4 stars out of 5. He thought that Rhett "displays an omnivorous cultural appetite" in the album where Rhett might be "dropping passing allusions to Guns N' Roses and Third Eye Blind" to using disco beat.  He judged Rhett to be "a true pop artist, harnessing the trends of his time and turning them into music that's hard to resist." Billboard also picked up on the disco influence, noting that songs in the album, such as "Tangled", "sound as Saturday Night Fever’d as anything recorded by a male country star in decades", but wondered whether "country radio will fully embrace their Nashville disco or ignore it."

Commercial
Tangled Up debuted on the Billboard 200 at No. 6 and Top Country Albums at No. 3, with 76,000 units sold, 63,000 of which are pure album sales.  It reached No. 2 on the Top Country Albums chart in its fourth week.  The album was certified Platinum by the RIAA on September 20, 2016. The album has sold over 598,900 copies in the US as of September 2017.

Track listing

Personnel
Musicians
 Thomas Rhett – lead vocals
 Charlie Judge – keyboards
 Matt Stanfield – keyboards
 Jesse Frasure – programming 
 Joe London – keyboards, programming, electric guitar, bass
 Chris DeStefano – keyboards, acoustic piano, programming, acoustic guitar, electric guitar, banjo, steel guitar, bass, drums, backing vocals
 Charlie Puth – keyboards (12), backing vocals (12)
 Dann Huff – electric guitar
 Rob McNelley – electric guitar
 Chris Stapleton – electric guitar, backing vocals
 Derek Wells – electric guitar
 Danny Rader – acoustic guitar
 Paul Franklin – steel guitar
 Teddy Geiger – bass
 Jimmie Lee Sloas – bass
 Chris Kimmerer – drums
 Byron "Mr. Talkbox" Chambers – talk box
 Sean Douglas – backing vocals
 Russell Terrell – backing vocals
 Jordin Sparks – vocals (11)
 LunchMoney Lewis – vocals (12)
 Danielle Bradbury – vocals (17)
 Tori Kelly – vocals (18)

Technical and design
 Jesse Frasure – recording (1-10)
 Steve Marcantonio – recording (1-10)
 Chris DeStefano – recording (11, 13)
 Joe London – recording (12)
 Shawn Daugherty – recording assistant (1-10)
 Seth Morton – recording assistant (1-10), additional recording (4, 5, 9, 10)
 Russell Terrell – additional recording (1, 2, 4-10)
 Justin Niebank – mixing at Blackbird Studio (Nashville, Tennessee) and Hound's Ear Studio (Franklin, Tennessee)
 Drew Bollman – mix assistant 
 David Huff – digital editing 
 Sean Neff – digital editing 
 Adam Ayan – mastering at Gateway Mastering (Portland, Maine)
 Mike "Frog" Griffith – production coordinator 
 Laurel Kittleson – production coordinator 
 Alicia Matthews – production coordinator 
 Becky Reiser – art direction, graphic design 
 Sandi Spika Borchetta – art direction
 Abbey Lanigan – graphic design 
 John Shearer – cover photography 
 Joseph Llanes – additional photography

Charts

Weekly charts

Year-end charts

Decade-end charts

Certifications

References 

2015 albums
Thomas Rhett albums
Big Machine Records albums
Albums produced by Dann Huff
Albums produced by Jesse Frasure
Albums produced by Lindsay Rimes